Vladimir Vladimirovich Parfenovich (born 2 December 1958) is a retired Belarusian sprint canoer and politician.

Sport
Parfenovich competed for the Soviet Union at the Moscow Olympics and became the first canoer to win all three events he entered: K-1 500 m, K-2 500 m and K-2 1000 m. He also won twelve medals at the ICF Canoe Sprint World Championships, with nine golds (K-1 500 m: 1979, 1981–1983; K-2 500 m: 1979, 1981, 1982; K-2 1000 m: 1981, 1982) and three silvers (K-1 500 m: 1978, K-2 500 m: 1983, K-2 1000 m: 1983).

Parfenovich retired from competitions after learning that the 1984 will be boycotted by the Soviet Union. He then worked as an instructor for the Sport ministry of Belarus and served in the KGB and police forces. In 1995–2007 he headed the Canoe-Kayak Federation of Belarus and was a member of the Belarusian Olympic Committee. After that he trained canoers in Russia, and in 2013 became head coach of the Russian team.

Politics
In 2000, he entered politics and was elected to the National Assembly of Belarus. He joined the parliamentary group Respublika that opposed the government of Aleksandr Lukashenko. On 3 June 2004, Parfenovich and two other members of parliament, general Valery Fralou and Siarhiej Skrabiec, started a hunger strike, arguing that the chair of the parliament did not give them the chance for debate and did not put to vote their proposed amendments to the election code. They stopped the strike on 21 June, when parliament voted against their proposals.

References

1958 births
Living people
Sportspeople from Minsk
Belarusian male canoeists
Canoeists at the 1980 Summer Olympics
Olympic canoeists of the Soviet Union
Olympic gold medalists for the Soviet Union
Soviet male canoeists
Olympic medalists in canoeing
ICF Canoe Sprint World Championships medalists in kayak
Medalists at the 1980 Summer Olympics
Belarusian sportsperson-politicians
Members of the House of Representatives of Belarus
Politicians from Minsk